Bouches-del'Èbre was a province of the First French Empire.

History

Louis-Gabriel Suchet, Duc d'Albufera was the military governor of Bouches del'Èbre.
Bouches del'Èbre was founded on 12 February 1812.

Geography
The province of Bouches-del'Èbre was in what is now modern Spain or more precisely Catalonia.

See also
Department of Segre

References

Subdivisions of the First French Empire
History of Catalonia